A baking powder submarine is a plastic toy submarine that dives and surfaces with the addition of baking powder. Baking powder submarines are sometimes misidentified as "baking soda submarines"; however, baking soda alone dissolves but does not react when placed in water.

History
In 1953 Benjamin and Harry Hirsch, two brothers in a cosmetics company, discovered that carbon dioxide gas bubbles produced in wet baking powder as part of the chemical leavening process could be used to make a toy submarine dive up and down in fresh water.

They sold their idea to the Kellogg's breakfast cereal company in 1954. Buoyed by the popularity of the first American atomic submarine USS Nautilus commissioned in that year, a million  plastic ship model prizes were produced by May. They were mailed out in return for a fee of 25 cents and one cereal boxtop. A smaller  version was later produced to be used as a cereal box prize not requiring separate redemption by mail.

Principle of operation
Baking powder is placed into a compartment in the bottom of the toy which is sealed except for a small hole (or holes). The toy sinks when placed into water, but after a few seconds, enough water leaks in to react with the baking powder and produce carbon dioxide bubbles. The resulting foam creates just enough buoyancy in the toy for it to rise towards the surface of the water. When the toy surfaces, it capsizes, releasing the gas into the air. The toy sinks, beginning the reaction again and repeating the entire process.

The same principle of operation was later used for toy frogmen powered by baking powder in a small container on the foot of the figure. However, some other cereal prizes were cartesian divers, which operated on a different principle and did not require baking powder.

In popular culture
 In the original novel and film Billy Liar, the title character's parents say they declared their love for him by buying him a box of corn flakes with a submarine inside.

 In the Everybody Loves Raymond episode "Your Place or Mine?", Ray and Robert (and later Robert and Frank) fight over who gets to own the submarine cereal prize (Robert loses both times).

Notes

External links
 Torgo's baking powder submarine web page
 A 1955 patent for a baking powder submarine

1950s toys
Powered toys
Model boats
Water toys